Olga Brózda and Anouk Tigu were the defending champions, having won the event in 2012, but both players chose not to defend their title.

Julia Wachaczyk and Nina Zander won the title, defeating Emma Laine and Piia Suomalainen in the final, 6–4, 6–4.

Seeds

Draw

References 
 Draw

Tampere Open - Women's Doubles
2013 Women's Doubles